Selglaid is an island belonging to the country of Estonia. It is located approximately 2 km of the west coast of the Pärnumaa county in Estonia.

See also
List of islands of Estonia

  

Estonian islands in the Baltic
Lääneranna Parish
Islands of Estonia